David Tweh (born 25 December 1998) is a Liberian professional footballer who plays for Hapoel Nof HaGalil and the Liberian national team.

References

External links 
 
 

1998 births
Living people
Sportspeople from Monrovia
Liberian footballers
Association football midfielders
Fath Union Sport players
Barrack Young Controllers FC players
FC Energetik-BGU Minsk players
FC Dynamo Brest players
FC Rukh Brest players
Hapoel Nof HaGalil F.C. players
Liberia international footballers
Liberian expatriate footballers
Expatriate footballers in Belarus
Expatriate footballers in Israel
Liberian expatriate sportspeople in Belarus
Liberian expatriate sportspeople in Israel